Łukasz Kubot and Oliver Marach were the defending champions, but they lost to Mariusz Fyrstenberg and Marcin Matkowski in the semifinals.
Daniel Nestor and Nenad Zimonjić won the final against Mariusz Fyrstenberg and Marcin Matkowski 7–5, 3–6, [10–5].

Seeds

Draw

Draw
{{16TeamBracket-Compact-Tennis3-Byes
| RD1=First round
| RD2=Quarterfinals
| RD3=Semifinals
| RD4=Final

| RD1-seed01=1
| RD1-team01= D Nestor N Zimonjić
| RD1-score01-1=6
| RD1-score01-2=6
| RD1-score01-3= 
| RD1-seed02= 
| RD1-team02= A Seppi S Vagnozzi
| RD1-score02-1=0
| RD1-score02-2=0
| RD1-score02-3= 

| RD1-seed03= 
| RD1-team03= S González P Marx
| RD1-score03-1=6
| RD1-score03-2=6
| RD1-score03-3= 
| RD1-seed04= 
| RD1-team04= K Beck L Dlouhý
| RD1-score04-1=4
| RD1-score04-2=3
| RD1-score04-3= 

| RD1-seed05=4
| RD1-team05= J Knowle A Ram
| RD1-score05-1=77
| RD1-score05-2=6
| RD1-score05-3= 
| RD1-seed06=WC
| RD1-team06= A Haider-Maurer N Moser
| RD1-score06-1=61
| RD1-score06-2=4
| RD1-score06-3= 

| RD1-seed07= 
| RD1-team07= M Kohlmann P Riba
| RD1-score07-1=1
| RD1-score07-2=1
| RD1-score07-3= 
| RD1-seed08= 
| RD1-team08= M Čilić L Zovko
| RD1-score08-1=6
| RD1-score08-2=6
| RD1-score08-3= 

| RD1-seed09= 
| RD1-team09= M Berrer T de Bakker
| RD1-score09-1=6
| RD1-score09-2=3
| RD1-score09-3=[10]
| RD1-seed10=WC
| RD1-team10= G Melzer J Melzer
| RD1-score10-1=4
| RD1-score10-2=6
| RD1-score10-3=[3]

| RD1-seed11= 
| RD1-team11= M Melo B Soares
| RD1-score11-1=65
| RD1-score11-2=7
| RD1-score11-3=[5]
| RD1-seed12=3
| RD1-team12= M Fyrstenberg M Matkowski
| RD1-score12-1=77
| RD1-score12-2=5
| RD1-score12-3=[10]

| RD1-seed13= 
| RD1-team13=
| RD2-score06-1=6
| RD2-score06-2=6
| RD2-score06-3= 

| RD2-seed07= 
| RD2-team07= C Kas P Kohlschreiber
| RD2-score07-1= 
| RD2-score07-2= 
| RD2-score07-3= 
| RD2-seed08=2
| RD2-team08= Ł Kubot O Marach
| RD2-score08-1=w/o
| RD2-score08-2= 
| RD2-score08-3= 

| RD3-seed01=1
| RD3-team01= D Nestor N Zimonjić
| RD3-score01-1=6
| RD3-score01-2=6
| RD3-score01-3= 
| RD3-seed02=4
| RD3-team02= J Knowle A Ram
| RD3-score02-1=4
| RD3-score02-2=2
| RD3-score02-3= 

| RD3-seed03=3
| RD3-team03=

External links
 Main draw

Bank Austria-TennisTrophy - Men's Doubles
Vienna Open